Ting is a carbonated beverage popular in the Caribbean. It is flavored with  Jamaican grapefruit juice (from concentrate) and is both tart and sweet. Ting comes in a green glass bottle, green plastic bottle or a green and yellow can. Like Orangina, the beverage contains a small amount of sediment consisting of grapefruit juice pulp. Ting is produced in the United Kingdom under license by Refresco Beverages.  Ting also now makes Pink Ting Soda, Orange Ting, Diet Ting Soda, and ginger beer.

History
Ting was first produced in 1976 by Desnoes & Geddes Limited. Desnoes & Geddes Limited was acquired by Guinness in 1993 with a 51% share. With Desnoes and Geddes moving to focus on beer alone, its soft drink facility in Jamaica was acquired in 1999 by PepsiCo affiliate Pepsi-Cola Jamaica, located in Kingston, Jamaica. Ting is distributed throughout the Caribbean, the United States, and Canada. Outside these regions it is not commonly available, although it is also produced in the UK using Jamaican grapefruits.

Ting has also been known to be mixed with citrus vodka to create Ving, an alcoholic version of the drink.

Unrelated American soft drink of same name
An unrelated soft drink product, also called "Ting," was a local popular favorite soda in central and northeastern Wisconsin, which existed prior to the arrival of Jamaican Ting.  Produced by the Kist Bottling Company and later by the Wisconsin Waupaca Bottling Company, Wisconsin-made Ting came in an assortment of flavors, such as cream soda, grapefruit, cola, orange, grape, and several other flavors.  This version of Ting has not been available since 2009, due to a lapse in trademark renewal that allowed PepsiCo to take over the tradename "Ting" for soft drink products for distribution in the United States.  Many of the original Ting flavors were produced in the classic  distinctive clear glass bottles under the tradename "Flavor 8" soda in New London, Wisconsin by Flavor 8 Bottling L L C.  However, Flavor 8 shut down in 2015, and sold to Whistler Bottling Company.

References

Grapefruit sodas
Soft drinks
Caribbean drinks
Jamaican cuisine
Jamaican brands
Products introduced in 1976